Lusitanipus is a genus of millipedes in the family Dorypetalidae. The genus is endemic to the Iberian peninsula; L. alternans is endemic to Portugal and L. xanin is only known from Spain. It was believed to be a monotypic genus until the 2020 discovery of L. xanin.

Species 
There are currently two species in the genus:

 Lusitanipus alternans 
 Lusitanipus xanin

References 

Callipodida
Millipedes of Europe